Nestan-Darejan (1556–1612) was queen consort of Kartli, a kingdom in eastern Georgia, as the wife of King Simon I, whom she married in 1559. Nestan-Darejan was a daughter of King Levan of Kakheti and a half-sister of Levan's successor to the throne of Kingdom of Kakheti, Alexander II. Her husband spent nearly five decades fighting the Safavid Iranian and Ottoman encroachments on his kingdom, twice losing his throne and personal freedom. Nestan-Darejan suffered further, being humiliated by his half-brother, the king of Kakheti, who capitalized on Simon's difficulties to attack and loot Kartli. After Simon had been sent a prisoner to Iran in 1569, Nestan-Darejan's estates had been pillaged by Prince Bardzim Amilakhori, Alexander's father-in-law; and in 1580, following Simon's return to Kartli and his defeat by Alexander at Dighomi, the latter carried off after the battle his half-sister's drawers on the point of a lance. Nestan-Darejan outlived her husband and died sometime after 1612, having mothered six children, including Simon's successor to the throne of Kartli, George X.

Marriage  
Nestan-Darejan was born of Levan of Kakheti's second marriage to a daughter of the shamkhal of Tarki, whom the king married in 1529 after he divorced his first wife, Tinatin Gurieli. Nestan-Darejan married Simon I of Kartli in 1559. This union was one of the first interdynastic marriages between the Kartlian and Kakhetian branches of the Bagrationi dynasty, holding sway over the two breakaway successors of the once united Kingdom of Georgia. The union was followed by a pact between the two monarchies, one aim being to evict the Iranian garrison from Tbilisi, the capital of Kartli. Levan of Kakheti eventually hung back, but allowed his son and heir, Prince Giorgi, to join Simon's army. The Georgians lost the ensuing confrontation and Giorgi was killed on the battlefield.

Persecution  
After the Iranian army captured Simon in battle and sent for imprisonment at Alamut in 1569, Queen Nestan-Darejan found herself in a hostile environment in Kartli. Main threats to her security came from her half-brother Alexander II, a disowned son of Levan, on whose death he succeeded as king of Kakheti, having defeated and massacred his half-brothers. Out of favor with the Safavid protégé Daud-Khan—Simon's Islamized brother and a rival ruler at Tbilisi, who was married to Alexander's relative—the queen became a target of harassment by Prince Bardzim Amilakhori, Alexander II's father-in-law, who, joined by the duke of Ksani, raided and completely looted her estate.

Return to power  
The invasion of the Ottoman army of the Georgian lands led by Lala Kara Mustafa Pasha and the quick collapse of Daud-Khan's regime in 1578 compelled the Iranian government to release Simon as the only ruler capable to mount resistance to the Ottoman advance. Back to his homeland, Simon had his domestic adversaries, including Prince Amilakhori, arrested. Amilakhori and the duke of Ksani pleaded for mercy and approached Nestan-Darejan, who persuaded her husband to issue amnesty for them, having reclaimed, in return, what has been lost to these noblemen and, further, Akhalgori and Mejuda from the duke and Kaspi and Karbi from Amilakhori.

Further misfortunes  
Alexander of Kakheti's enmity to Simon remained undiminished owing to his hatred of his half-sister. In 1580 the Kakhetian army surprised Simon, staying without troops at Dighomi, and put him to flight. Alexander could not get at Simon, but he, the Georgian chronicle says, dishonored Nestan-Darejan and, "like a brigand", rode off bearing his half-sister's drawers high upon a lance. Simon vowed revenge and assaulted Alexander's army at Chotori, putting the Kakhetians to rout and Alexander to flight.

After years of heavy fighting, Simon's turbulent reign ended in 1600, when he was captured by the Ottoman army and sent in prison to Constantinople. His son, George X, succeeded him. Nestan-Darejan outlived both her son, who died in 1606, and her husband, who died in captivity in 1611. His remains were brought by the Georgian merchant Diakvnishvili from Constantinople to Nestan-Darejan and interred at the cathedral of Mtskheta. Nestan-Darejan's subsequent life is obscure. She lived on to see the accession to the throne of her young grandson, Luarsab II, subsequently a Christian martyr and saint of the Georgian Orthodox Church, and died sometime after 1612.

Children  
Simon and Nestan-Darejan had six children, four sons and two daughters:

 Prince Giorgi (c. 1560 – 1606), King of Kartli as George X;
 Prince Luarsab (fl. 1561–1589), taken as a hostage to Iran in 1582;
 Prince Aleksandre (fl. 1561–1589);
 Prince Vakhtang (fl. 1600), sometime governor of Akhaldaba and Dirbi. He had a son, Luarsab (died in 1650), adopted by King Rostom of Kartli in 1639;
 Princess Elene (fl. 1583–1609), wife of Manuchar II Jaqeli, Atabag of Samtskhe;
 Princess Fahrijan-Begum (fl. 1582), who married Shahzada Sultan Hamza Mirza (died in 1578 or 1586), son of Shah Tahmasp I or Mohammed Khodabanda.

Ancestry

Notes

References 

16th-century births
1610s deaths
Bagrationi dynasty of the Kingdom of Kakheti
Queens consort from Georgia (country)
People from Kakheti
16th-century people from Georgia (country)
17th-century people from Georgia (country)
17th-century women from Georgia (country)
16th-century women from Georgia (country)